Priscilla Florencio (born April 9) is a Brazilian singer, songwriter and dancer. She made her US debut in 2013 with the video premiere of her first single "See U On The Dance Floor".
The video was choreographed by Dionne “Loca De Jamaica” Renee, a dancer and choreographer who has worked with such artists as Shakira, Usher, and Nicki Minaj.

In March 2014, Priscilla released her second single "California."
In May of the same year during the 2014 FIFA World Cup, Priscilla released her third single "Vai(Go!)".
In  2016, Priscilla was discovered by one of the biggest music producers in Brazil Dj Batutinha who introduced Priscilla to Brazilian Music Manager "Kamilla Fialho". By the end of April Priscilla got  signed with one of the Top and controversial music label in Brazil "K2L Empreendimentos Artisticos Ltda" of manager kamilla fialho, the same label that made two superstars in Brazil  as Anitta (singer) and Lexa (singer)  "

Early life
Born in Belo Horizonte, Brazil, Priscilla discovered her passion for performing at the age of six. She began to showcase her talent in her local community and won a local dance competition in which she was the youngest competitor. She became a regular at Brazilian theatre Teatro Marilia, and moved on to make several appearances on various Brazilian television shows. At the age of 17, Priscilla moved to Portugal where she attended college and earned her Master's degree in Psychology. After graduating college, Priscilla relocated to Los Angeles, California to pursue her music career in early 2014.

Other ventures
Philanthropy

While in college she developed a passion for animal rights and spent much of her spare time rescuing animals and has since become an advocate for PETA, an American animal rights organization based in Norfolk, Virginia.

In the Media
Entertainment news page, Extra (TV program), Debuted Priscilla's First Music Video and First Single "See U on The Dance Floor" making Priscilla the First Ever Brazilian Singer to get featured In their News.

North American Magazine, Chulo Magazine, invited Priscilla to appear on the cover of the June 2014 issue of the publication, calling her a "Brazilian Pop Sensation." Priscilla was also the first singer to appear on the cover of the publication.

Brazilian Television Network Rede Globo interviewed Priscilla in Los Angeles. In the Interview Priscilla was compared to the American Singer Britney Spears and was referred by the reporter as a promise of Success in the U.S Music Industry.

References

External links
 

1994 births
Living people
Brazilian singer-songwriters
People from Belo Horizonte
Animal rescuers
Brazilian female dancers
Brazilian pop singers
21st-century Brazilian singers
21st-century Brazilian women singers
Brazilian women singer-songwriters